William Noah Hedges (16 July 1856 – 21 November 1935) was an Australian politician. Born in Hertfordshire in England, he received a primary education before his migration to Australia in 1878, where he became a public works contractor. He moved to Western Australia in 1893, where he became a company director. In 1906, he was elected to the Australian House of Representatives as the member for Fremantle, representing the Western Australian Party as its only representative (John Forrest was nominally the leader but in practice did not involve himself in the party). Hedges sat effectively as an independent until 1909, when he joined the newly formed Commonwealth Liberal Party. He held the seat until his defeat in 1913. In 1929, he was appointed President of the Western Australian Employers Federation; he remained in this position until his death in 1935.

References

Commonwealth Liberal Party members of the Parliament of Australia
Members of the Australian House of Representatives for Fremantle
Members of the Australian House of Representatives
1856 births
1935 deaths
Western Australian Party members of the Parliament of Australia
20th-century Australian politicians